Ectoedemia minimella is a moth of the family Nepticulidae. It is widely distributed in the Holarctic.

The wingspan is 5-6 mm. Adults are black with whitish fascia and eyecaps. Adults are on wing from May to June with one generation per year.

The larvae are leaf miners and feed on species of birch, alder, and hazel. The mine consists of a short tortuous corridor that widens into a blotch, often between two lateral veins, with scattered frass. Pupation takes place outside of the mine.

This species was first described by Swedish naturalist Johan Wilhelm Zetterstedt in 1839.

References

External links

Fauna Europaea
bladmineerders.nl
Ectoedemia minimella at UKMoths
Swedish moths
 Ectoedemia minimella images at  Consortium for the Barcode of Life

Nepticulidae
Moths of Europe
Moths of North America
Taxa named by Johan Wilhelm Zetterstedt
Moths described in 1839